Soundtrack for Life is the only studio album by Canadian DJ A:xus. It was the first record to be released by Guidance Records, and includes the hit single "Abacus," under the name "When I Fall In Love," which was a Top 75 hit in the UK.

Critical reception

The album was met with positive reviews. Allmusic commented that the album has "strong, clever production skills and a feel for musical variety that never sounds forced." A review by Blues & Soul felt that the album "fuses all the best parts of deep house with tinges of jazz, funk, ambient and garage to very good effect."

Track listing
Baghdad Café (Callin' U) (6:51)
Raw Emotions (4:27)
My Planet Rocks (5:56)
Synchronicity (5:43)
Near or Far (3:34)
Pluto (5:58)
Oceans Between Us (2:35)
Soundtrack 4 Life (4:01)
Lazy, Crazy, Hazy Days (3:56)
Taxi Blues (4:05)
Nice to See You Again (3:32)
When I Fall In Love (Abacus) (5:42)
You Make Me Feel Like (Peace & Love & Happiness) (6:14)

References

House music albums by Canadian artists
2000 debut albums
Acid jazz albums